Crocker's Folly is a Grade II* listed public house at 24 Aberdeen Place, St John's Wood, London. It was built in 1898, in a Northern Renaissance style, and was previously called The Crown. Geoff Brandwood and Jane Jephcote's guide to heritage pubs in London describes it as "a truly magnificent pub-cum-hotel" with "superb fittings", including extensive use of marble. The architect was Charles Worley.

Interior
The highlight is the "grand saloon" as it was originally known. There is an exceptional marble fireplace, as well as a marble-topped bar counter. Altogether 50 different types of marble are used, with paired marble Corinthian pilasters supporting the opulent part-gilded beamed ceiling, and even the chimney and the saloon walls are faced with marble.

Frank Crocker
In 1987, the pub's name was changed to Crocker's Folly, which had been its nickname for many years. The story was that Frank Crocker, believing he had a reliable tip-off about the site of the new terminus of the Great Central Railway, built the pub on a lavish scale to serve it, however when the terminus was actually built it turned out to be over half a mile away at Marylebone Station – leading to Crocker's ruin, despair and eventual suicide, jumping from the window of an upper floor. In reality, Crocker died in 1904, aged only 41, but of natural causes, although the subsequent landlord, Charles Durden, did kill himself in the way described.

Every wall, window and ceiling was decorated in ornate style, with soaring pillars, wood panelling and elaborate stucco featuring gambolling cherubs. Its grand saloon used 50 types of marble to create a magnificent bar-top, archways, an enormous fireplace and soaring pillars, which in turn supported the opulent part-gilded beamed ceiling. Even the chimney and walls were faced with marble.

Redevelopment
The pub closed in autumn 2004 and in November 2011, Westminster City Council gave outline planning consent for the conversion of the three upper floors to residential use. It was noted that the building was on the English Heritage Buildings at Risk Register, and in need of urgent repair.

In February 2014, London Drinker magazine reported that work had begun on the conversion of the upper floors to apartments and that the ground floor would be converted to a restaurant, perhaps with a bar.

In 2014, it was acquired by Maroush, a group of Lebanese restaurants, and it reopened in October 2014 as a Lebanese restaurant and bar.

References

External links

Grade II* listed pubs in the City of Westminster
National Inventory Pubs
Buildings and structures completed in 1898
St John's Wood
Buildings by Charles Worley